Ambiguity is the third album by German metal band Brainstorm; released in 2000 this was the first with Andy B. Franck on vocals.

Track listing
All songs written and arranged by Brainstorm, all lyrics by Andy B. Franck.

 "Crush Depth" – 6:06
 "Tear Down the Walls"  – 3:54
 "Beyond My Destiny"  – 8:41
 "Arena"  – 3:53 
 "Coming Closer"  – 5:52
 "Darkest Silence"  – 0:54 
 "Maharaja Palace"  – 5:27
 "Far Away"  – 5:47
 "Revenant" - 4:44 (limited edition bonus track)
 "Demonsion"  – 6:36
 "Lost Unseen"  – 6:14
 "Perception of Life"  – 4:27

Personnel
Andy B. Franck - lead and backing vocals
Torsten Ihlenfeld - guitar, keyboards and backing vocals, engineer
Milan Loncaric - guitar and backing vocals
Andreas Mailänder - bass
Dieter Bernert - drums

Additional musicians
Michael 'Miro' Rodenberg - keyboards

Production
Dirk Schlächter - producer, engineer, backing vocals
Sascha Paeth - mixing, mastering

References

2000 albums
Brainstorm (German band) albums
Metal Blade Records albums